Trent Harris (born 1952) is an independent filmmaker based in Salt Lake City, Utah. In 2013, Indiewire proclaimed Harris "The Best Underground Filmmaker You Don’t Know — But Should. 

Harris’ films have played at dozens of festivals and museums worldwide with screenings at: Sundance, San Francisco Museum of Modern Art, the British Film Institute in London, the Edinburgh Film Festival, the Museum of Modern Art in Vienna Austria, Les Laboratories in Aubervilliers France, The Yerba Buena Center for the Arts in San Francisco and the Pacific Film Archive in Berkeley.

Career 
Harris taught film and screenwriting classes at the University of Utah and worked as a documentarian and television journalist. He wrote and directed six feature films, many experimental movies, and more than one-hundred documentaries for PBS, National Geographic, NBC, and others.

In 1991, he wrote and directed the comedy Rubin and Ed, in which Crispin Glover and Howard Hesseman wander the desert looking for a suitable place to bury a frozen cat. 

In 2001 he released The Beaver Trilogy, a compilation film that documents his obsession with a man called Groovin' Gary (Richard Griffiths). The Beaver Trilogy features Sean Penn and  Crispin Glover as Groovin' Gary in part two and part three, respectively. The Los Angeles Critics Association awarded Harris "Best Independent Experimental Film," was listed by the London Guardian as one of ”Fifty Lost Masterpieces,” and hit the "Top Ten" list of Art Forum Magazine. At AFI, Harris twice filmed fictionalized versions of Groovin’ Gary's story, renaming his protagonist Larry Huff.

In 2012, he finished the feature film, Luna Mesa which stars Richard Dutcher and Alex Caldiero.

In 2015, he was the subject of a documentary called Beaver Trilogy Part IV, narrated by Bill Hader, which examined his The Beaver Trilogy film and his relationship with its star, Richard Griffiths.

Harris' web series Echo People is a spin-off of Rubin and Ed.

Harris has written three books: The Wild Goose Chronicles, Fate Is A Hairy Rodent, and Mondo Utah.

Filmmaking Style 
When Harris describes his technique, he compares himself to two directors most film lovers would never mention in the same breath: Michelangelo Antonioni and Ed Wood.

Filmography

Feature films
 Rubin and Ed (1991)
 Plan 10 from Outer Space (1994)
 The Beaver Trilogy (2001)
 Delightful Water Universe (2008)
 Luna Mesa (2012)
 Welcome to the Rubber Room (2017)

References

Sources

External links
Trent Harris Films, Official website
Luna Mesa (hosts films) 
Vlog

Archives

Interview 
Plum TV Telluride Interviews Trent Harris at Sundance

American film directors
Living people
Artists from Salt Lake City
1952 births